Iva Majoli was the defending champion and won in the final 4–6, 7–6, 6–4 against Jana Novotná.

Seeds
A champion seed is indicated in bold text while text in italics indicates the round in which that seed was eliminated. The top four seeds received a bye to the second round.

  Jana Novotná (final)
  Anke Huber (second round)
  Iva Majoli (champion)
  Karina Habšudová (second round)
  Brenda Schultz-McCarthy (second round)
  Barbara Paulus (semifinals)
  Sabine Appelmans (second round)
  Elena Likhovtseva (quarterfinals)

Draw

Final

Section 1

Section 2

External links
 1997 Faber Grand Prix Draw

Faber Grand Prix
1997 WTA Tour